Szadkowice  is a village in the administrative district of Gmina Sławno, within Opoczno County, Łódź Voivodeship, in central Poland.

The village has an approximate population of 280.

References

Szadkowice